Sandit Tiwari is an Indian television actor. He  played the role of Sahib in Me Aajji Aur Sahib and Sagar in Mahisagar.

Tiwari was born in Bhilai. He is an electrical engineer and has done Master of Business Administration from University Business School – Chandigarh.

Tiwari started his career the television show Beend Banoongaa Ghodi Chadhunga in 2011. After that he played the lead role in Me Aajji Aur Sahib and a cameo in Anamika   He also played an episodic roles in Crime Patrol  and Fear Files: Darr Ki Sacchi Tasvirein.

Television
 Beend Banoongaa Ghodi Chadhunga  as Rakesh (2011)
  Me Aajji Aur Sahib   as  Vishwaas Bapat (2012)
 Fear Files (2013)
 Anamika   as Shekher (2013)
  Mahisagar   as  Sagar Mehta ( 2013–14)
  Jamai Raja  as  Prashant (2014)
  C.I.D.  as Arvind (2015)
  Naya Mahisagar  as Sagar Mehta (2016)
  Savdhaan India  as Manas (2016)

References

Living people
People from Bhilai
Male actors from Chhattisgarh
Indian male soap opera actors
Indian male television actors
21st-century Indian male actors
Male actors from Mumbai
Year of birth missing (living people)